András Winkler (born 9 November 2000) is a Hungarian footballer who plays as winger for Budaörsi SC.

Career

Bruck/Leitha
Ahead of the 2019-20 season, Winkler joined Austrian Regionalliga club ASK-BSC Bruck/Leitha.

References

External links
András Winkler at ÖFB

2000 births
Living people
Hungarian footballers
Hungarian expatriate footballers
Association football forwards
Nemzeti Bajnokság I players
Nemzeti Bajnokság II players
Austrian Regionalliga players
Szombathelyi Haladás footballers
Soproni VSE players
Mosonmagyaróvári TE 1904 footballers
Lipót SE players
Budaörsi SC footballers
Hungarian expatriate sportspeople in Austria
Expatriate footballers in Austria
People from Mosonmagyaróvár
Sportspeople from Győr-Moson-Sopron County